Mountain Gate is a census-designated place (CDP) in Shasta County, California, United States. Its population is 815 as of the 2020 census, down from 943 from the 2010 census.

Geography
According to the United States Census Bureau, the CDP covers an area of 6.1 square miles (15.8 km), all land.

Demographics
The 2010 United States Census reported that Mountain Gate had a population of 943. The racial makeup of Mountain Gate was 850 (90.1%) White, 7 (0.7%) African American, 27 (2.9%) Native American, 5 (0.5%) Asian, 0 (0.0%) Pacific Islander, 13 (1.4%) from other races, and 41 (4.3%) from two or more races. Hispanic or Latino of any race were 49 persons (5.2%).

The Census reported that 943 people (100% of the population) lived in households, 0 (0%) lived in non-institutionalized group quarters, and 0 (0%) were institutionalized.

There were 403 households, out of which 101 (25.1%) had children under the age of 18 living in them, 169 (41.9%) were opposite-sex married couples living together, 60 (14.9%) had a female householder with no husband present, 19 (4.7%) had a male householder with no wife present.  There were 40 (9.9%) unmarried opposite-sex partnerships, and 4 (1.0%) same-sex married couples or partnerships. 119 households (29.5%) were made up of individuals, and 36 (8.9%) had someone living alone who was 65 years of age or older. The average household size was 2.34.  There were 248 families (61.5% of all households); the average family size was 2.83.

The population was spread out, with 182 people (19.3%) under the age of 18, 84 people (8.9%) aged 18 to 24, 184 people (19.5%) aged 25 to 44, 325 people (34.5%) aged 45 to 64, and 168 people (17.8%) who were 65 years of age or older.  The median age was 46.4 years. For every 100 females, there were 100.6 males.  For every 100 females age 18 and over, there were 99.2 males.

The homeowner vacancy rate was 1.8%; the rental vacancy rate was 9.6%.  618 people (65.5% of the population) lived in owner-occupied housing units and 325 people (34.5%) lived in rental housing units.

Politics

References

Census-designated places in Shasta County, California
Census-designated places in California